Drillbit Taylor is a 2008 American coming-of-age comedy film directed by Steven Brill, produced by Judd Apatow, Susan Arnold and Donna Arkoff Roth with screenplay by Kristofor Brown and Seth Rogen based on an original story by John Hughes (his final film work before his death in 2009). In the film, three high school pupils decide to hire an adult bodyguard to protect them from two bullies who endlessly harass and abuse them before developing a friendly relationship with him.

The film stars Owen Wilson as the eponymous role, alongside Nate Hartley, Troy Gentile, David Dorfman, Alex Frost, Josh Peck and Leslie Mann in supporting roles.

Drillbit Taylor was released by Paramount Pictures on March 21, 2008. Upon release, the film received mixed reviews, with criticism directed mainly toward the screenwriting, the direction and the mean-spirited nature, but praised the humor, Wilson's performance and the chemistry between the cast.

Plot
On the first day of high school, freshmen Wade and Ryan witness bullies Filkins and Ronnie attack a geek, Emmit, stuffing him into his locker. Wade intervenes, so the two begin endlessly targeting Wade, Ryan and Emmit. Emmit also befriends the duo, much to Ryan's dismay.

Wade suggests hiring a bodyguard. They place an ad on the Internet, and after a series of disturbing interviews with ex-cons and hired guns, they end up selecting Drillbit Taylor. Drillbit pretends to be a martial arts expert and mercenary, but is really a homeless beggar. His real intention of becoming their bodyguard was to rob them and use the money to buy a ticket to Canada. 

Drillbit suggests they find some common interests with Filkins and Ronnie. Ryan challenges Filkins to a rap battle, but gets carried away and ends up unintentionally humiliating him. So, an angry Filkins, alongside Ronnie, ambushes the trio. Trying out a tactic Drillbit taught them ultimately fails. The boys are furious with his teachings. But they decide to bring him to school as a substitute teacher, and in that capacity he is able to protect them. While there, Drillbit meets a teacher, Lisa Zachey, and they start a sexual relationship.

One morning as his mother is driving him to school, Ronnie sees Drillbit showering at the beach; his mother reveals that he is homeless. Filkins finds the boys and punches Drillbit. Later, at Wade's, they catch Drillbit's homeless friends stealing everything in sight, leaving the house completely empty. Drillbit confesses that his real name is Bob and he went AWOL from the U.S. Army and his name was Drillbit because he hurt his pinky finger in high school with a drillbit. 

The boys fire Drillbit, who later recovers all of Wade's possessions and places them back before Wade's parents return home. Unfortunately, the boys accidentally let slip about Drillbit. Their parents take things up with the principal, who contacts the police. Filkins plays innocent and charms all the adults; Filkins continues to ridicule the boys after Drillbit's disappearance. Tensions finally burst when Filkins interrupts Wade's attempt to ask his crush, Brooke Nguyen, out. Without thinking, Wade challenges Filkins to a fight. After Ryan insults Emmit, he refuses to help them.

Wade and Ryan arrive at Filkins' house, where he is hosting a party; initially the duo knock him down, but he soon overpowers them. Ronnie shows up to help Filkins against them. Emmit, who has a change of heart, comes to their aid and for a while causes quite a lot of pain to Filkins, almost defeating him; but Ronnie knocks him out while he is trying to break Filkins' leg.

Drillbit shows up and Filkins punches him. Drillbit refuses to fight back until it is revealed Filkins is 18, no longer an emancipated minor. Hearing this, Drillbit quickly begins fighting to defend the freshmen. He doesn't attack Ronnie when he reveals he's only 17. Within minutes, the police arrive and Drillbit flees for fear of prosecution. Filkins then throws a samurai sword at the boys in retaliation, but Drillbit catches it. He saves them, at the cost of half of his pinkie. Ronnie reveals to the police that Filkins had bullied him into being his accomplice when they interview him.

Filkins is arrested and shipped off to Hong Kong with his parents as an alternative to being sent to prison for breaking several underage drinking laws. Wade, with renewed confidence, asks Brooke out and she accepts, while Ryan finally accepts Emmit, and declares him a friend. 

Drillbit is taken to jail for deserting, but ends up being released within three weeks. He is reunited with Lisa and the boys and is soon employed at their school as a nurse. A post-credits scene shows a student entering the nurse's office telling Drillbit he received bruises from being beaten up. Drillbit then asks him for the name of the student, assuring he'll be safer from then on.

Cast

In addition, Valerie Tian plays Brooke, the girl Wade is sweet on, while cameo appearances include standup comics Kevin Hart and Lisa Lampanelli, the film's director, Steven Brill, and  "bodyguard candidates" that include Israeli Defence Force martial arts expert and Israel's Heavyweight Full Contact Champion Amir Perets, UFC Light Heavyweight Champion Chuck Liddell, and Adam Baldwin, who makes a dismissive reference to the plot of his 1980 film My Bodyguard.

Marketing
Marketing for the movie included television promos and coming attractions previews, but actor Owen Wilson did not conduct any interviews to promote the film. Instead, Paramount Pictures had Wilson record introductions for Fox's Sunday night primetime shows such as The Simpsons, American Dad!, King of the Hill, Family Guy, and Unhitched. The character of Drillbit was also featured as a "Superstar" on the RAW page of WWE.com for a period of time. Wilson's publicist said his availability was limited due to filming Marley & Me.

John Horn and Gina Piccalo of the Los Angeles Times wrote that the reason for Wilson's limited promotional schedule was due to studio executives being worried that interviewers would bring up Wilson's hospitalization for severe depression in the summer of 2007.

Reception

Box office
In its opening weekend, the film grossed $10.2 million in 3,056 theaters in the United States and Canada, ranking #4 at the box office. The film has grossed $32,862,104 in the United States and $16,828,521 in other countries adding to a total worldwide gross of $49,690,625.

Critical response
The site's consensus states: "Owen Wilson's charms can't save Drillbit Taylor, an unfunny, overly familiar bullied-teen comedy." On Metacritic the film has a score of 41 out of 100 based on reviews from 31 critics, indicating "mixed or average reviews". Audiences surveyed by CinemaScore gave the film a grade B on scale of A to F.

Home media

The film was released on both rated (102 minutes) and unrated (109 minutes) DVD and Blu-ray on July 1, 2008. About 620,927 units have been sold, bringing in $11,669,617 in revenue.

References

External links

 
 
 
 
 

2008 films
2000s high school films
2000s teen comedy films
American high school films
American teen comedy films
Apatow Productions films
Films about bullying
Films about educators
Films directed by Steven Brill
Films produced by Judd Apatow
Films scored by Christophe Beck
Films set in Los Angeles
Films shot in Los Angeles
Paramount Pictures films
Films with screenplays by Seth Rogen
2008 comedy films
Films about deserters
2000s English-language films
2000s American films